Krista Eileen Arrieta Kleiner (born June 12 1989), is a Filipino-American entertainer, creator and beauty queen. She joined Binibining Pilipinas 2010 (Miss Philippines) and won Binibining Pilipinas-International 2010 (Miss Philippines International). She represented the Philippines in Miss International 2010 wherein she placed in the Top 15 finalists.

Background

She joined the Binibining Pilipinas competition in 2010 (Miss Philippines).  She won the competition and was awarded "Best in Swim Suit" and "Best in Talent".

She was invited by Julio Iglesias to join him on his world tour as a special guest performer that would sing and dance before sell-out crowds in the Philippines, Japan, Malaysia, Australia, Canada, and even back in her own native United States.

Krista self-produced her debut album entitled Feels So Good'. She represented herself to labels and locked in multiple distribution deals for her project (Universal Records in the Philippines and Warner Music Group in Malaysia, Singapore, Brunei).

Notes

References
 Tinnie Esguerra, Philippine Star- Krista K: From beauty queen to glam diva
Isah Red, Manila Standard Today- Krista K now a Universal record singer
 Edwin Sallan, Interaksyon, Krista Kleiner reinvents herself as Krista K with feel-good dance album
 Melody Oei, MSN, Krista K
 Philippine Entertainment Portal, Krista Kleiner releases her debut album, Feels So Good
 Orange Magazine TV, Krista K To Perform with Craig David and Taboo of Black Eyed Peas In Malaysia

External links

Filipino people of German descent
American pageant participants of Filipino descent
Filipino people of American descent
Living people
Binibining Pilipinas winners
Miss International 2010 delegates
People from Fullerton, California
People from Quezon City
University of California, San Diego alumni
1989 births